The Yellow Line or Sunflower Line is one of the four lines of Lisbon Metro.

Stations 

 Odivelas
 Senhor Roubado 
 Ameixoeira
 Lumiar
 Quinta das Conchas
 Campo Grande 
 Cidade Universitária
 Entre Campos  
 Campo Pequeno
 Saldanha 
 Picoas
 Marquês de Pombal 
 Rato

Frequency

*Rato - Campo Grande**Campo Grande - Odivelas

Chronology

December 29, 1959: Opening of the original Lisbon Metro network with a Y shape. Common branch stations: Restauradores, Avenida, Rotunda (former name of the Marquês de Pombal station and where the line would split into the two branches). Current Blue Line branch stations (coming from Rotunda station): Parque, São Sebastião, Palhavã (former name of the Praça de Espanha station) and Sete Rios (former name of the Jardim Zoológico station). Current Yellow Line branch stations (coming from Rotunda station): Picoas, Saldanha, Campo Pequeno and Entre Campos.
 January 27, 1963: Opening of the Rossio station. Main branch route: Restauradores - Rossio.
 September 28, 1966: Opening of the Socorro (former name of the Martim Moniz station), Intendente and Anjos stations. Main branch route: Restauradores - Anjos.
 June 18, 1972: Opening of the Arroios, Alameda, Areeiro, Roma and Alvalade stations. Main branch route: Restauradores - Alvalade.
 October 15, 1988: Opening of the Cidade Universitária, Laranjeiras, Alto dos Moinhos and Colégio Militar/Luz stations. Current Blue Line branch route: Rotunda - Colégio Militar/Luz. Current Yellow Line branch route: Rotunda - Cidade Universitária.
 April 3, 1993: Opening of the Campo Grande station. Main branch route: Restauradores - Campo Grande. Current Yellow Line branch route: Rotunda - Campo Grande.
July 15, 1995: Creation of the Blue and Yellow lines by building a second Rotunda station. New Yellow line route: Rotunda - Campo Grande.
December 29, 1997: Opening of the Rato station. Line route: Rato - Campo Grande.
March 1, 1998: Rotunda station is renamed to Marquês de Pombal.
March 27, 2004: Opening of the Quinta das Conchas, Lumiar, Ameixoeira, Senhor Roubado and Odivelas stations. Line route: Rato - Odivelas.

Future
Plans are in place to extended the Yellow Line with two new stations (Santos and Estrela), connecting the Green Line on Cais do Sodré to the Yellow Line on Rato and creating a circle line with the merge of these two lines; this plan is currently on hold.

See also
 List of Lisbon metro stations

References

External links

Lisbon Metro lines
Railway lines opened in 1959